Helcystogramma albilepidotum is a moth in the family Gelechiidae. It was described by Hou-Hun Li and Hui Zhen in 2011. It is found in Sichuan, China.

The wingspan is about 15–16 mm. The forewings are dark yellowish brown, with scattered dark brown scales. There are black scale tufts at the middle of cell and at the middle of the fold, as well as a white scale tuft at the end of the cell and a narrow dark brown fascia from the costal four-fifths to before the tornus. The hindwings are pale grey.

Etymology
The species name refers to the white scale tuft at end of cell on forewing and is derived from Latin albus (meaning white) and lepidotus (meaning scaled).

References

Moths described in 2011
albilepidotum
Moths of Asia